Paul Hay (born 14 November 1980 in Glasgow, Scotland) is a Scottish professional footballer who plays for Scottish Third Division side Clyde.

Career
Hay joined Stirling Albion after a spell with Clyde. Hay made his debut for Clyde in February 1999 against Alloa Athletic in the Scottish Second Division. Hay played over 200 games (including cup games) for the Binos since his debut against Stranraer in March 2001. He scored his first goal for Stirling on 13 October 2001 against Peterhead.

At the end of the 2007-08 season, Hay was released by Stirling Albion. In June 2008 he signed for Scottish Third Division side East Stirlingshire. He stayed with the Shire for 3 years, before returning to his first club, Clyde, in June 2011. On 15 October 2011 he played in a 7–1 win against former team East Stirlingshire at Broadwood.

References

External links
 

1980 births
Scottish footballers
Clyde F.C. players
Stirling Albion F.C. players
East Stirlingshire F.C. players
Scottish Football League players
Living people
Association football midfielders